The 1982–83 Divizia A was the sixty-fifth season of Divizia A, the top-level football league of Romania.

Teams

League table

Results

Top goalscorers

Champion squad

See also 

 1982–83 Divizia B
 1982–83 Divizia C
 1982–83 Cupa României

References

Liga I seasons
Romania
1982–83 in Romanian football